The African National Congress retained majorities in the National Assembly of South Africa & National Council of Provinces as well as in all provincial legislatures with the exception of the Western Cape.  Members are elected using party-list proportional representation.

National Assembly (National List)
Candidates whose names are in bold were elected; names in italics were elected but chose not to take their seats.

Jacob Zuma
Cyril Ramaphosa
Malusi Gigaba
Naledi Pandor
Jeff Radebe
Fikile Mbalula
Blade Nzimande
Bathabile Dlamini
Lindiwe Sisulu
Collins Chabane
Angie Motshekga
Nathi Mthethwa
Pravin Gordhan
Nosiviwe Mapisa-Nqakula
Thoko Didiza
Aaron Motsoaledi
Derek Hanekom
Max Sisulu
Baleka Mbete
Thulas Nxesi
Maite Nkoana-Mashabane
Zizi Kodwa
Edna Molewa
S'bu Ndebele
Jeremy Cronin
Lulama Xingwana
Jackson Mthembu
Buti Manamela
Winnie Madikizela-Mandela
Nomaindia Mfeketo
Siyabonga Cwele
Gugile Nkwinti
Ngoako Ramatlhodi
Dipuo Peters
Stone Sizani
Lindiwe Zulu
Tina Joemat-Pettersson
Mildred Oliphant
Marthinus van Schalkwyk (later resigned)
Yunus Carrim
Tito Mboweni
Susan Shabangu
Robert Davies
Rejoice Mabudafhasi
Ayanda Dlodlo
Ruth Bhengu
Joyce Moloi-Moropa
Pam Tshwete
Dikeledi Maagadzi
Hlengiwe Mkhize
Thabang Makwetla
Rosemary Nokuzola Capa
Pule Mabe
Beauty Dlulane
Ebrahim Patel
Thandi Tobias
Ben Martins
Candith Mashego-Dlamini
Senzeni Zokwana
Lusizo Makhubela-Mashele
Mduduzi Manana
Tokozile Xasa
Mandla Mandela
Dikeledi Mahlangu
Joe Phaahla
Dipuo Letsatsi-Duba
David Mahlobo
Elsie Coleman
Mathole Motshekga
Dina Pule (declined nomination)
Obed Bapela
Connie September
Pallo Jordan
Lumka Yengeni
Ebrahim Ebrahim
Lynne Brown
Solomon Lechesa Tsenoli
Phumzile Ngwenya-Mabila
Fish Mahlalela
Sheila Shope-Sithole
Cassel Mathale
Xoliswa Sandra Tom
Mlungisi Johnson
Grace Tseke
Fikile Majola
Vatiswa Bam-Mugwanya
Godfrey Oliphant
Hendrietta Bogopane-Zulu
Madala Masuku
Fatima Chohan
Moses Masango
Raesibe Eunice Nyalungu
Sango Patekile Holomisa
Nokukhanya Mthembu
Mcebisi Skwatsha
Bongi Maria Ntuli
Andries Nel
Nomakhaya Mdaka
Enver Surty
Sibongile Manana
Monwabisi Goqwana

See also
African National Congress

References

Elections in South Africa
History of the African National Congress
2014 in South Africa